The  is a Japanese yōkai depicted in Toriyama Sekien's 1776 book Gazu Hyakki Yagyō, with its precursor or equivalent  documented earlier in 1686.

These beings presumably lick the filth and scum that collect in bathtubs and bathrooms.

Terminology 

The word aka refers to dead skin on a person's body, alongside the dirt, grime, or sweat that may be scrubbed or washed off; the aka can also refer to scum that accumulates at the bathhouse as a result, including perhaps mildew.

Hence the name akaname means 'scum-licker' or 'filth-licker".

There is speculation whether aka alludes to impurities or defilements of the soul, or negative thoughts known in Buddhism as bonnō (Sankskrit: kleshas), and the yōkai may serve as warning not to be so preoccupied with such thoughts as to be derelict in the chores of cleansing the bath of such filth. Another speculation is a possible connection to the sacred water used as offering in Buddhism, known as  water, or in Sanskrit, .

Edo period

The form  is also attested in a work called  compiled by Genki (presumably Kanda Genki).

Sekien did not provide any verbal details regarding his akaname, as was the case in all the yōkai depicted in this particular early work of his.
 However, the Nittō honzō zusan provided ample details, describing it as child-like, with a pebbly? head, round eyes, long tongue, and several example anecdotes are also provided. In classical Edo Period depictions the akaname resembles a human child with clawed feet and cropped heads, sticking out its long tongue at a bathing area. In Sekien's (monochrome) drawing the akaname stands around the corner of a "bathhouse", though the setting appears to be a bath housed in an outhouse separated from the main house (living quarters), rather than a public bathhouse. In the Hyakushu kaibutsu yōkai sugoroku (1858), it is depicted as an eerie, blue-black skinned figure.

The Kokon hyakumonogatari hyōban gives lecture on how the akaneburi originates, supposedly it spawns in an area where dust and grime/filth/scum (aka) at an old bathhouse or at a derelict tattered home. That is to say, the akaname was said to emanate （keshō ）from the ki (qi) energy or inki negative energy of the accumulated detritus, and the akaneburi also subsists on eating the filth of its environs.

A more sinister type of akaneburi which assumes the guise of a beautiful woman is also described in the entry in Nittō honzō zusan, and it is claimed she will lick away the blood and flesh until only the skeletal carcass remains. The work gives as example the anecdote concerning a man who was in the hot springs at Banshū (Harima Province), and when he allowed a woman to scrub his back, he was licked down to his bones and died.

Shōwa, Heisei, and beyond
In literature about yōkai from the periods of Shōwa, Heisei, and beyond, akaname and akaneburi were interpreted the same way as above. These interpretations state that the akaname is a yōkai that lives in old bathhouses and dilapidated buildings that would sneak into places at night when people are asleep using its long tongue to lick the filth and grime sticking to bath places and bathtubs. It does not do anything other than lick filth, but since yōkai were considered unsettling to encounter, it is said that people worked hard to ensure that the bath places and bathtubs are washed clean so that the akaname wouldn't come.

There were none who saw what the akaname truly were, but since aka can remind people of the color red (aka in Japanese), they are said to have red faces or be entirely red. And due to the double entendre pun on aka which can refer to both the filth which is the yōkai's essence and to the color red, a (modern) artist tends to conventionally illustrate the akaname as being of red color.

In popular culture
In 2020, Lush released a bubble bar named for and modeled after the creatures.

See also
 Aka Manto ("Red Cape"), a Japanese urban legend about a spirit which appears in bathrooms
 Bannik, a spirit which appears in bathhouses in Slavic mythology
 Hanako-san, a Japanese urban legend about the spirit of a young girl who haunts school bathrooms
 Madam Koi Koi, an African urban legend about the ghost of a woman who haunts school
 Teke Teke, a Japanese urban legend about the spirit of a girl with no legs

Explanatory notes

References 
Citations

Bibliography cited

 
 
 
  

Japanese bathroom ghosts
Japanese folklore
Yōkai